Saccocalyx is a genus of flowering plant in the family Lamiaceae, first described in 1835. It contains only one known species, Saccocalyx saturejoides, native to Morocco and Algeria.

References

Lamiaceae
Plants described in 1835
Flora of North Africa